"Julia" is a song performed by British pop duo Eurythmics. Written by group members Annie Lennox and David A. Stewart 
and produced by Stewart, the song was the second and final single released from their album 1984 (For the Love of Big Brother), which served as the soundtrack to the film Nineteen Eighty-Four, an adaptation of George Orwell's political novel of the same name, and plays during the film's ending credits. The band were controversially chosen alongside the Dominic Muldowney orchestral composition.

Song information

Musical concept
The song is a ballad with very sparse electronic instrumentation and an almost a cappella performance by Lennox. Her vocals are accentuated by vocoder effects in the background. The title and lyrics of the song are based upon the novel's heroine and love interest, Julia. The cover artwork for the single is a still image from the film, featuring English actress Suzanna Hamilton as Julia.

Midway through the song, an instrumental line based on J. S. Bach's "Fugue #2 in C Minor" from The Well Tempered Clavier, Book 1, can be heard.

Reception
Cash Box said that the song is "a dreamy and ethereal piece which is almost exclusively Lennox’ airy vocals and David Stewart’s synthesizer meanderings."

Breaking a string of six consecutive Top 10 hits, "Julia" peaked at number 44 on the UK singles chart.

Other versions
The version of "Julia" found on the soundtrack differs from the one being played during the end-credits of the film - which is more string based with less synthetic arrangements. This is also the case for many of the other songs on the soundtrack versus their version used in the film.

Music Video
The music video for Julia was directed by Chris Ashbrook (who had directed the previous promo for Sexcrime) and was filmed towards the end of 1984. The video consists simply of a closeup of Lennox's face whilst she sings and was later included on the VHS/DVD Eurythmics Greatest Hits, even though the song itself wasn't included on the compilation album of the same name.

Track listings
7"
A: "Julia" [edited]
B: "Ministry of Love"

12"
A: "Julia" (extended mix) *
B: "Ministry of Love" (extended)

* this version although labelled as "extended" is the same as the one found on the album 1984 (For the Love of Big Brother)

Charts

References

1985 songs
1985 singles
Eurythmics songs
Songs about fictional female characters
Music based on Nineteen Eighty-Four
Songs written for films
Songs written by David A. Stewart
Songs written by Annie Lennox
Song recordings produced by Dave Stewart (musician and producer)
1980s ballads
Synth-pop ballads
RCA Records singles
Virgin Records singles